Xinwan Road (Chinese: 新湾路) is the east terminus of Line 8 of the Hangzhou Metro in China. Opened on 28 June 2021, it is located in the Qiantang District of Hangzhou.

References 

Hangzhou Metro stations
Railway stations in China opened in 2021